The Wachapreague people were an Algonquian Native American people who lived in coastal Virginia centuries ago.

The town of Wachapreague, Virginia, and the Wachapreague Channel are named for them.

Captain John Smith reported contact with these Indians.

References

Native American tribes in Virginia
Algonquian ethnonyms
Algonquian peoples
Indigenous peoples of the Northeastern Woodlands